Dejan Čurović (10 August 1968 – 11 August 2019) was a Serbian footballer who played as a striker.

A powerful forward, Čurović played with four clubs during his career, namely Zemun and Partizan in the former Yugoslavia, as well as Vitesse and Groningen in the Netherlands. He secured legendary status at Vitesse by scoring the last ever goal at the Nieuw Monnikenhuize and the opening goal at the GelreDome.

Playing career
Čurović started out at his local club Zemun. He was a member of the team that won the Yugoslav Second League in 1990. In his debut season in the Yugoslav First League, Čurović scored 11 goals in 27 appearances, as the club finished in 13th place.

In the summer of 1993, Čurović was transferred to Partizan. He quickly formed a prolific striking partnership with Savo Milošević and finished the 1993–94 season as the team's second-highest scorer with 27 goals, helping the Crno-beli win the double.

After a successful year at Partizan, Čurović moved abroad and signed with Dutch club Vitesse. He spent six seasons in Arnhem, scoring 47 goals across all competitions. In the summer of 2000, Čurović switched to fellow Eredivisie side Groningen. He spent three years at the club, before retiring from the game.

Post-playing career
In June 2011, Čurović was appointed as sporting director of Serbian First League club Inđija.

Death
Čurović died from leukemia on 11 August 2019, one day after his 51st birthday.

Career statistics

Honours
Zemun
 Yugoslav Second League: 1989–90
Partizan
 First League of FR Yugoslavia: 1993–94
 FR Yugoslavia Cup: 1993–94

References

External links
 
 

1968 births
2019 deaths
People from Zemun
Footballers from Belgrade
Yugoslav footballers
Serbia and Montenegro footballers
Serbian footballers
Association football forwards
FK Zemun players
FK Partizan players
SBV Vitesse players
FC Groningen players
Yugoslav Second League players
Yugoslav First League players
First League of Serbia and Montenegro players
Eredivisie players
Serbia and Montenegro expatriate footballers
Expatriate footballers in the Netherlands
Serbia and Montenegro expatriate sportspeople in the Netherlands
Deaths from leukemia